Maxjazz (corporately styled MAXJAZZ) was an American jazz record label founded in 1998 by investment banker Richard McDonnell. Maxjazz recordings are generally regarded as a "straight-ahead" acoustic style of jazz. It was based in St. Louis, Missouri. In 2016, Maxjazz was bought by Mack Avenue Records.

Recording artists 

 Claudia Acuña
 Bruce Barth
 Erin Bode
 LaVerne Butler
 Carla Cook
 Emanuele Cisi
 Dena DeRose
 Asa Harris
 Christine Hitt
 Geoffrey Keezer
 Nancy King
 Frank LoCrasto
 Romero Lubambo
 Russell Malone
 Phillip Manuel
 René Marie
 Peter Martin
 Rebecca Martin
 Cassandre McKinley
 Mulgrew Miller
 Ben Paterson
 Jeb Patton
 Jeremy Pelt
 John Proulx
 Eric Reed
 Mary Stallings
 Terrell Stafford
 Trio Da Paz & Joe Locke
 Manuel Valera
 Patti Wicks
 Jack Wilkins
 Jessica Williams
 Steve Wilson
 Ben Wolfe
 Denny Zeitlin

References

External links 
 Maxjazz catalog at Mack Avenue Records

American record labels
Jazz record labels